AGLC may refer to:
 Alberta Gaming, Liquor and Cannabis Commission, an agency of the Government of the Canadian province of Alberta
 Australian Guide to Legal Citation, the predominant style guide for law journals in Australia
 Atlanta Gas Light Company, the largest natural gas wholesaler in the Southeastern US
 AGLC Imbel, a .308 sniper rifle manufactured in Brasil